Auditorio Nacional may refer to:
Auditorio Nacional (Mexico), Mexico City
Metro Auditorio, a Metro station
National Auditorium of Music (Auditorio Nacional de Música), Madrid, Spain
National Auditorium of Sodre (Auditorio Nacional de Sodre), Uruguay
Auditório Nacional, Cape Verde